William Henry Young FRS (London, 20 October 1863 – Lausanne, 7 July 1942) was an English mathematician. Young was educated at City of London School and Peterhouse, Cambridge. He worked on measure theory, Fourier series, differential calculus, amongst other fields, and made contributions to the study of functions of several complex variables. He was the husband of Grace Chisholm Young, with whom he authored and co-authored 214 papers and 4 books. Two of their children became professional mathematicians (Laurence Chisholm Young, Cecilia Rosalind Tanner).  Young's Theorem was named after him.

In 1913 he was the first to be appointed to the newly created chair of Hardinge Professorship of Pure Mathematics in Calcutta University which he held from 1913 to 1917. He also held the part-time Professorship of Philosophy and the History of Mathematics at the University of Liverpool from 1913 to 1919.

He was elected a Fellow of the Royal Society on 2 May 1907. He served as the president of the London Mathematical Society from 1922 to 1924. In 1917 he was awarded the De Morgan Medal of London Mathematical Society and in 1928 the Sylvester Medal of the Royal Society.

He served as the president of the International Mathematical Union from 1929 to 1936.

Works

 William Henry Young & Grace Chisholm Young (1906) The Theory of Sets of Points, link from Internet Archive.

References

External links
University of Liverpool: Papers of Professor William Henry Young and Grace Chisholm Young

19th-century British mathematicians
20th-century British mathematicians
Alumni of Peterhouse, Cambridge
Fellows of the Royal Society
1863 births
1942 deaths
De Morgan Medallists
Academic staff of the University of Calcutta